Malegaon Lok Sabha constituency was one of the 48 Lok Sabha (parliamentary) constituencies of Maharashtra state in western India. Since 2009, It is merged and become part of Dhule Lok Sabha constituency

Members of Parliament

See also
 Malegaon
 Malegaon Central Assembly constituency
 Malegaon Outer Assembly constituency
 Dhule Lok Sabha constituency
 List of Constituencies of the Lok Sabha

References

Former Lok Sabha constituencies of Maharashtra
Former constituencies of the Lok Sabha
2008 disestablishments in India
Constituencies disestablished in 2008